Justo Moreno (born 26 September 1952) is a Peruvian sports shooter. He competed at the 1980 Summer Olympics and the 1984 Summer Olympics.

References

1952 births
Living people
Peruvian male sport shooters
Olympic shooters of Peru
Shooters at the 1980 Summer Olympics
Shooters at the 1984 Summer Olympics
Place of birth missing (living people)